Chavettu Pada is a 1991 Indian Malayalam film, directed by Sekhar.  The film had musical score by S. P. Venkatesh.

Cast

Radhika Sarathkumar

References

External links
 

1991 films
1990s Malayalam-language films